Çaltıkoru is a village in the central district of Hakkâri Province in Turkey. The village is populated by Kurds of the Mamxûran tribe and had a population of 37 in 2022.

The hamlets of Dikmen, Gümüşlü, Koçlu and Yukarıköy are attached to the village.

History 
The village was populated by 30 Assyrian families in 1850 and 20 families in 1877.

Population 
Population history from 2007 to 2022:

References 

Villages in Hakkâri District
Kurdish settlements in Hakkâri Province
Historic Assyrian communities in Turkey